The sportingoods tryonia, scientific name Tryonia angulata, is a species of small freshwater snail with a gill and an operculum, an aquatic gastropod mollusk in the family Hydrobiidae. This species is endemic to the United States.

Description
It has 5.0 to 7.0 whorls and is colorless/transparent.

References

 Turgeon, D. D., J. F. Quinn, Jr., A. E. Bogan, E. V. Coan, F. G. Hochberg, W. G. Lyons, et al. (1998), Common and scientific names of aquatic invertebrates from the United States and Canada: Mollusks, 2nd ed., American Fisheries Society Special Publication 26, p. 526, American Fisheries Society, Bethesda, Maryland, USA

Tryonia
Endemic fauna of the United States
Gastropods described in 1987
Taxonomy articles created by Polbot
Molluscs of the United States